The École nationale supérieure des Arts Décoratifs (ÉnsAD, also known as Arts Decos', École des Arts Décoratifs) is a public grande école of art and design of PSL Research University. The school is located in the Rue d'Ulm in Paris.

Profile
The École nationale supérieure des arts décoratifs played a major role in the development of the Art Deco design movement in the 1920s and in the creation of new design concepts.
The School has an international reputation for its teaching in the fields of animation, photography, scenography, industrial design, communication design, interactive design, video, interior design, fashion, textile and engraving.

History
The E.N.S.A.D. has its roots in the École royale gratuite de dessin (Royal Free School of Design) founded in 1766 by Jean-Jacques Bachelier, confirmed in 1767 by letters patent from Louis XV of France. Its founder's aim was to develop crafts relating to the arts in order to improve the quality of manufactured goods. Through a rigorous and demanding apprenticeship in the Arts, the school strove to combine technique and culture, intelligence and sensitivity, so as to enable the more gifted artisans to develop into creative artists. After several changes of name, in 1877 the school became the National School of Decorative Arts (École nationale des arts décoratifs) before taking its present name of ENSAD (École nationale supérieure des arts décoratifs) in 1927.

Directors 
Léon Deshairs −1940 and 1943–1945
Léon Moussinac 1945–1959
Jacques Adnet 1959–1970
Michel Tourlière
Richard Peduzzi 1990–2002
Patrick Raynaud 2002–2008
Geneviève Gallot 2008–2013
Marc Partouche 2014-2018 : 
Emmanuel Tibloux 2018 -

Notable teachers 

 Pierre Bernard (graphic designer)
 Rosa Bonheur
 Cassandre
 Marcel Gromaire
 André Lurçat
 Pierre Louis Rouillard, professor of sculpture from 1840 to 1881
 Joseph-André Motte furniture and interior designer
 Philippe Starck
 Roger Tallon

Notable alumni

 Philippe Apeloig, graphic designer
 Ximena Armas, painter
 Antun Augustinčić, sculptor
 Pierre Bismuth, artist
 François Boisrond, painter
 Ronan Bouroullec, designer
 Yvonne Canu, painter
 Nina Childress, painter
 Claude Closky, artist
 Paul Coze, artist
 Leon Dabo, painter
 Léon Delarbre, painter, museum curator
 Philippe Dupuy, cartoonist
 Benoît-Pierre Émery, graphic designer
 Vincent Ferniot, actor, presenter, writer
 Jean-Paul Goude, photographer and director
 René Georges Hermann-Paul, artist and illustrator
 John Howe, illustrator and author
 Camille Henrot, artist
 Pierre Huyghe, artist
 Jean Jansem, painter
 Marcel Ichac, director and photographer
 Richard Isanove, cartoonist
 Claire Keane, illustrator
 Fernand Léger, artist
 Georges Léonnec, illustrator
 Annette Messager, artist
 Morteza Momayez, graphic designer
 Fernand Mourlot, lithographer, publisher
 Thierry Mugler, fashion designer
 Victor Nicolas, sculptor
 Francis Picabia, artist
 Arthur de Pins, director of the 2000 animated short film Geraldine
 Charles Ethan Porter, painter
 Robert Poughéon, painter
 Alfred-Georges Regner, painter engraver
 Pierre Roy, painter
 Émile Savitry, painter, photographer
 Jacques Tardi, cartoonist
 Raymond Templier, jewelry designer
 Adrien Voisin (1890–1979), American sculptor. 
 Jean-Didier Wolfromm, critic, writer
 Cédric Blaisbois, director, graphic designer

References

External links

 Official ENSAD Website

Art schools in Paris
Design schools in France
Decorative arts
Grands établissements
University of Paris
1766 establishments in France
Schools in Paris
Educational institutions established in 1766